Le Bataclan '72 is a sixteen-track live album by Lou Reed, John Cale and Nico. It was recorded from the soundboard and heavily bootlegged over the years, before it gained an official release in 2004.

Background and production 

The album was recorded during a live show at the Bataclan club in Paris, on January 29, 1972, and was originally broadcast on French TV. The concert marked the first time since the breakup of The Velvet Underground that Reed, Cale and Nico were on stage together.

Release 

Though the recording had been bootlegged for years, Le Bataclan '72 was officially released on October 19, 2004, featuring two exclusive bonus tracks (both rehearsals—"Pale Blue Eyes" and "Candy Says"). Due to a problem with tape transfers, the speed is slow compared to the original concert. A speed-corrected version is on iTunes.

Track listing

 "I'm Waiting for the Man" (Reed)
 "Berlin" (Reed)
 "The Black Angel's Death Song" (Reed, Cale)
 "Wild Child" (Reed)
 "Heroin" (Reed)
 "Ghost Story" (Cale)
 "The Biggest, Loudest, Hairiest Group of All" (Cale)
 "Empty Bottles" (Cale)
 "Femme Fatale" (Reed)
 "No One Is There" (Nico)
 "Frozen Warnings" (Nico)
 "Janitor of Lunacy" (Nico)
 "I'll Be Your Mirror" (Reed)
 "All Tomorrow's Parties" (encore)  (Reed)
 "Pale Blue Eyes" (rehearsal) (Reed)
 "Candy Says" (rehearsal) (Reed)

Personnel

 Lou Reed – vocals, guitar
 John Cale – vocals, keyboards, guitar, viola
 Nico – vocals, harmonium

References

External links 

 

Nico albums
Albums produced by Lou Reed
Albums produced by John Cale
John Cale live albums
Lou Reed live albums
2004 live albums